Rodney D. Lewis is a United States Air Force major general who serves as deputy director for force protection of the Joint Staff and the Joint Integrated Air and Missile Defense Organization. He most recently served as the Director of Strategy, Posture, and Assessments of the United States Air Force and, prior to that, was the Deputy Director for Operations (Operations Team One) of the Joint Staff.

Education
1991 Bachelor of Science, Human Factors Engineering, U.S. Air Force Academy, Colorado Springs, Colo.
1995 Master of Science, Systems Management, with honors, University of Southern California, Los Angeles, Calif.
1995 Squadron Officer School, Maxwell Air Force Base, Ala.
2003 Joint Air Command and Staff College, Maxwell AFB, Ala., by correspondence
2004 Marine Corps Command and Staff College, Quantico, Va., by correspondence
2005 Joint Professional Military Education II, Joint Forces Staff College, Norfolk, Va.
2006 Master of Science, Strategic Leadership-International Relations and Public Policy, Air Force Institute of Technology, Wright-Patterson AFB, Ohio
2007 Aspen Institute Socrates scholar, Aspen, Colo.
2007 Air War College, Maxwell AFB, Ala., by correspondence
2008 Navigating Public Policy, University of Washington, Tacoma, Wash.
2009 United States-Japan Foundation Leadership Program Fellow (2010-2011)
2011 White House Fellow, Office of the First Lady, Washington, D.C. (2011-2012)
2012 Air Force Fellow-National Security Forum, Air University, Maxwell AFB, Ala.
2012 Aspen Institute Ideas Scholar, Aspen, Colo.
2013 Georgetown Public Policy Institute, Executive Certificate Nonprofit Management, Washington, D.C.
2014 Harvard Business School Advanced Management Program, Boston, Mass.
2016 Enterprise Perspective Seminar, Washington, D.C.
2018 Aspen Institute Executive Seminar on Leadership, Values, and the Good Society, Aspen, Colo.
2019 The Government Affairs Institute at Georgetown University, Certificate in Legislative Studies, Washington, D.C.

Assignments
1. August 1991–February 1992, Student Pilot, 7th Student Squadron, Vance Air Force Base, Okla.
2. February 1992–September 1992, Student Pilot, 26th Student Squadron, Vance AFB, Okla.
3. September 1992–September 1994, Flight Test Engineer, 417th Flight Test Squadron, Edwards AFB, Calif.
4. September 1994–September 1995, FTE, 412th Flight Test Wing, Edwards AFB, Calif.
5. September 1995–October 1996, Initial Cadre C-17 Globemaster III Pilot, 17th Airlift Squadron, Charleston AFB, S.C.
6. October 1996–September 1997, Executive Officer, 17th AS, Charleston AFB, S.C.
7. September 1997–April 1999, Pilot Scheduler, 17th AS, Charleston AFB, S.C.
8. April 1999–January 2000, Airlift Director, 17th AS, Charleston AFB, S.C.
9. January 2000–August 2000, Squadron Safety Officer, 17th AS, Charleston AFB, S.C.
10. August 2000–July 2002, C-17 Aircraft Commander, 701st AS, Air Force Reserve Command, Lowry AFB, Colo.
11. July 2002–January 2003, Chief, Current Operations, 16th AS, Charleston AFB, S.C.
12. January 2003–May 2003, Chief, 437th Airlift Wing Contingency Cell, Charleston AFB, S.C.
13. May 2003–May 2005, 437th Airlift Wing Executive Officer, Charleston AFB, S.C.
14. May 2005–May 2006, Air Force Institute of Technology, Wright-Patterson AFB, Ohio
15. June 2006–June 2008, Secretary of the Air Force, Office of Legislative Liaison, Washington, D.C.
16. July 2008–December 2009, Chief of Safety, Director of Staff, C-17 Instructor Pilot, Joint Base Lewis-McChord AFB, Wash.
17. December 2009–July 2011, Commander, 4th Airlift Squadron, JB Lewis-McChord, Wash.
18. September 2012–June 2014, Chief, Legislative/Interagency Affairs, U.S. Transportation Command, Washington, D.C.
19. August 2014–June 2015, Vice Commander, 3rd Wing, JB Elmendorf-Richardson, Alaska
20. July 2015–April 2017, Wing Commander, 319th Air Base Wing, Grand Forks AFB, N.D.
21. April 2017–June 2019, Director, SecAF/CSAF Executive Action Group, the Pentagon, Arlington, Va.
22. July 2019–August 2020, Deputy Director for Operations, Operations Team One, National Joint Operations and Intelligence Center, the Pentagon, Arlington, Va.
23. August 2020–June 2021, Director, Strategy, Posture, and Assessments, Deputy Chief of Staff, Strategy, Integration, and Requirements, Headquarters Air Force, the Pentagon, Arlington, Va.
24. June 2021–present, Deputy Director for Force Protection, J8, Joint Chiefs of Staff, the Pentagon, Arlington, Va.

Dates of rank

Awards and decorations

References

Living people
Place of birth missing (living people)
Recipients of the Defense Superior Service Medal
Recipients of the Legion of Merit
United States Air Force generals
United States Air Force personnel of the Iraq War
Year of birth missing (living people)